Old Man On His Back Plateau is a small plateau in the south-western region of the Canadian province of Saskatchewan, south-east of the hamlet of Robsart. Old Man on His Back Prairie and Heritage Conservation Area covers much of the plateau.

See also 
Geography of Saskatchewan

References 

Hills of Saskatchewan
Natural history of Saskatchewan
Reno No. 51, Saskatchewan
Plateaus of Canada
Great Plains
Landforms of Saskatchewan
Division No. 4, Saskatchewan